Liezel Huber and Lisa Raymond were the defending champions, but Huber chose not to compete that year. Raymond played with Sabine Lisicki.
Raquel Kops-Jones and Abigail Spears defeated in the final the fourth seeded Anna-Lena Grönefeld and Květa Peschke with the score 6–1, 6–4.

Seeds

Draw

Draw

References
 Main Draw

2012 Doubles
Toray Pan Pacific Open - Doubles
2012 Toray Pan Pacific Open